House of a Thousand Guitars (2009) is the sixth studio album by singer/songwriter Willie Nile, comprising a mixture of piano ballads and classic guitar rock.  The album is dedicated to the memory of Nile’s brother John.

Track listing
 "House of a Thousand Guitars" – 4:04 (Nile)
 "Run" – 4:25 (Nile)
 "Doomsday Dance" – 4:15 (Nile, Lee)
 "Love is a Train" – 5:29 (Nile)
 "Her Love Falls Like Rain" – 3:04 (Nile, Lee)
 "Now That The War Is Over" – 4:35 (Nile)
 "Give Me Tomorrow" – 4:47 (Nile, Lee)
 "Magdalena" – 3:48  (Nile, Lee)
 "Little Light" – 5:00 (Nile, Lee)
 "Touch Me" – 4:48 (Nile, Lee)
 "The Midnight Rose" – 4:20 (Nile, Lee)
 "When The Last Light Goes Out on Broadway" – 4:05 (Nile, Lee)

Personnel
 Willie Nile – guitar, vocals, piano, pump organ
 Andy York – Guitar, background vocals
 Steuart Smith – Guitar, bass, piano, pump organ, keyboard
Brad Albetta – Bass
Rich Pagano – Drums, percussion, background vocals
Frankie Lee – Drums, percussion, background vocals
Brian Mitchell – Piano, organ
Stewart Lerman – Bass, guitar
Rob Morsberger - Strings
Christopher Hoffman – Cello
Charlie Elgart – Organ
Hirsh Gardner – Background vocals
Tracie Gardner – Background vocals
Michela Gardner – Background vocals

Technical personnel
Producers – Willie Nile, Andy York, Brad Albetta, Rich Pagano, Stewart Lerman, Frankie  Lee, Hirsh Gardner
Engineering – Rich Pagano, Rich Lamb, Stewart Lerman
Mixing – Hirsh Gardner, Stewart Lerman
Mastering – Fred Kevorkian
Art Direction – Victoria Collier
Photography – Lorraine Simon
Creative Director for Willie Nile Music – Deborah Maniaci
Legal – Bob Donnelly (Lommen Abdo)
Publicity – Cary Baker – Conqueroo, Los Angeles, CA
Management – Gary Borress

References

External links
[ Link to All Music Guide]
Willie on MySpace
House of a Thousand Guitars review, Gary Graff at Billboard
Twanville Review of House Of A Thousand Guitars by Mayer Danzig

2009 albums
Willie Nile albums
Albums produced by Stewart Lerman